This is a list of players in the Australian Football League (AFL) who have either made their AFL debut or played for a new club during the 2021 AFL season.

Summary

AFL debuts

Change of AFL club

See also 

 List of AFL Women's debuts in 2021

References 

 Full listing of players who made their AFL or club debut in 2021

Australian rules football records and statistics
Australian rules football-related lists
Debut